Toshiko Mariano and Her Big Band is a jazz album recorded in Tokyo by Toshiko Akiyoshi (then Toshiko Mariano) in July 1964 and released in the US on the Vee-Jay Records label.  It was also released on the Nippon Columbia label in Japan under the title, Toshiko and Modern Jazz.   In addition to the 4 big band arrangements featuring a full 16 piece jazz orchestra, there are also three smaller combo tracks on this album.

Track listing
LP side A
 "Kisarazu Jinku" (traditional. Arrangement: Akiyoshi) – 5:10
 "Lament" (Johnson) – 4:42
 "The Shout" (Mariano) – 5:45
LP side B
 "Israel" (Carisi.  Arrangement: Mariano) – 4:03
 "Land of Peace" (Feather) – 4:18
 "Walkin'" (Carpenter) – 4:53
 "Santa Barbara" (Mariano) – 5:19
(Track order of the Vee Jay release shown.  Track order on the Nippon Columbia release = A3, A2, A1, B4, B2, B3, B1)

Personnel
 Toshiko Akiyoshi – piano
 Paul Chambers – bass
 Jimmy Cobb – drums
 Akira Miyazawa (宮沢昭) – tenor saxophone (all tracks except "Lament")
 Hidehiko "Sleepy" Matsumoto (松本英彦) – tenor saxophone (all tracks except "Lament")
 Hiroshi Okazaki (岡崎広志) – alto saxophone (tracks A1, A3, B1, B4)
 Shigeo Suzuki (鈴木重男) – alto saxophone (tracks A1, A3, B1, B4)
 Tadayuki Harada (原田忠幸) – baritone saxophone (tracks A1, A3, B1, B4)
 Hisao Mori (森寿男) – trumpet (tracks A1, A3, B1, B4)
 Shigeru Takemura (竹村茂) – trumpet (tracks A1, A3, B1, B4)
 Tetsuo Fushimini (伏見哲夫) – trumpet (tracks A1, A3, B1, B4)
 Terumasa Hino (日野皓正) – trumpet (tracks A1, A3, B1, B4)
 Hiroshi Suzuki (鈴木弘) – trombone (tracks A1, A3, B1, B2, B4)
 Mitsuhiko Matsumoto (松本文彦) – trombone (tracks A1, A3, B1, B4)
 Teruhiko Kataoka (片岡輝彦) – trombone (tracks A1, A3, B1, B4)
 Takeshi Aoki (青木武) – trombone (tracks A1, A3, B1, B4)

References
[ Allmusic]
Nippon Columbia PS-1126, COCB-53621, Columbia SW-7057
Vee Jay VJR-2505, Vee Jay VJ-023

Toshiko Akiyoshi albums
1964 albums
Vee-Jay Records albums
Nippon Columbia albums